Tony Wise may refer to:

 Tony Wise (skiing), founder of the cross-country ski race American Birkebeiner
 Tony Wise (American football) (born 1951), American football coach